Four on the Floor is an album by American hardcore punk band Dag Nasty, released in 1992 through Epitaph Records. Four on the Floor was a one-shot reunion record recorded while the band members were on vacation in Los Angeles in the summer of 1991. Guitar tracks are credited to "Dale Nixon," not Brian Baker; Baker could not use his real name because he was at the time under contract with the blues/metal band Junkyard.

Critical reception
The Washington Post called it a "first-rate" album, writing that the "sound is as punchy and the lyrics as smart as ever; muscular yet melodic, such songs as 'Still Waiting' and 'S.F.S.' manage to be both urgent and infectious."

Track listing
"Still Waiting" - 2:52
"Going Down" - 2:24
"Turn It Down" - 3:25
"Million Days" - 3:37
"Roger" - 1:20
"S.F.S." - 2:51
"We Went Wrong" - 3:22
"Down Time" - 2:51
"Lie Down and Die" - 2:27
"Mango" - 3:12

Personnel
Dave Smalley - Vocals
Brian Baker (credited as Dale Nixon) - Guitars
Roger Marbury - Bass
Colin Sears - Drums

References

Dag Nasty albums
1992 albums
Epitaph Records albums

it:Four on the Floor